Włodzisław or Władysław (date of birth unknown – died after 944/945) was a Duke of Lendians.

Life
As ruler of Lendians, he paid tribute to Kievan Rus', which is confirmed by archaeological studies and biography of Constantine VII Porphyrogennetos. In 944/945 Duke sent his emissary Uleb to Constantinople, where took place talks on peace between Igor of Kiev and Byzantine emperors: Romanos I Lekapenos and Constantine VII, as evidenced by Nestor Chronicle.

References

10th-century rulers in Europe